Regar-TadAZ Tursunzoda (Tajiki: Регар-ТадАЗ Турсунзода клуби футболи),, is a Tajik professional football club based in Tursunzoda, that currently play in the top division. Regar-TadAZ have dominated football in Tajikistan since the turn of the 21st century

History
Regar-TadAZ Tursunzoda was formed in 1975 as "Metallurg", and was made up of workers from the TALCO plant. In December 2013, Regar-TadAZ were on the brink of bankruptcy after their main sponsor, TALCO suffered financial problems.

In August 2017, Makhmadjon Khabibulloev returned to the club as manager.

Domestic history

Continental history

Honours

Domestics
Ligai Olii Tojikiston
Championship (7): 2001, 2002, 2003, 2004, 2006, 2007, 2008
Tajikistan Cup
Winners (5): 2001, 2005, 2006, 2011, 2012
Tajikistan Football Federation Cup
Winners (2): 2012, 2016

Continental
AFC President's Cup
Winners (3): 2005, 2008, 2009

Current squad
References

External links
  Official club website (archived 17 January 2011)
Club statistics on KLISF''
Varzish-sport

Football clubs in Tajikistan
Association football clubs established in 1950
AFC President's Cup winning clubs